Weekly Mansions is the thirty-fifth studio album by Omar Rodríguez-López as a solo artist, released on 4 November 2016. It is his ninth release in the 12-album series initiated by Ipecac Recordings.

Co-written between Omar and his brother Marcel, Weekly Mansions is described as "an eclectic exploration of neo-electro-dance". This is one of the few Rodriguez-Lopez's albums to not feature any guitar whatsoever. The title likely references the Japanese hotel chain where the bulk of this album was composed.

"Metallic Sweating for the Rich" contains the original track used as the outro to "Piedras y Ansiedad" from 2010's Tychozorente.  "Disheartening Envelope" is an extended version of "Células Hermosas", previously released on Octopus Kool Aid, elements of which were present throughout Tychozorente as well. "Want, Need, Scream in a Dream" is an original version of what eventually became the intro to The Mars Volta's song "Zed And Two Naughts" from Noctourniquet.

"Science Urges" was uploaded in advance as the album's single and went on to be re-recorded by Omar in 2018 and released on July 24, 2020, as part of The Clouds Hill Tapes Parts I, II & III.

Track listing
All music written by Omar and Marcel Rodríguez-López. All lyrics and vocal melodies written by Omar Rodríguez-López.
 "Essential Punishments" – 3:29
 "Rotten Straw Lips" – 3:45
 "Metallic Sweating for the Rich" – 1:14
 "Science Urges" – 4:10
 "Want, Need, Scream in a Dream" – 0:50
 "Sophia as Well" – 3:28
 "The Editor" – 0:56
 "A Little Old Picnic in Fort Collins" – 4:11 
 "Disheartening Envelope" – 3:26
 "Get in There Before You Sour" – 2:45
 "Head Is Made of Straw" – 1:27
 "Right on My Finger" – 3:55
 "They Ain't Kidding Me" – 2:02
 "Bone Fat" – 4:16

Personnel
 Omar Rodríguez-López – vocals, synths, sequences, xylophone, production, recording
 Marcel Rodríguez-López – synths, mellotron, programming, percussion, production, recording, mixing
 Teri Gender Bender – backing vocals

Production
 Lars Stalfors – production, recording
 Jon Debaun – recording
 Chris Common – mixing, mastering
 Mackie – layout

Release history

References

2016 albums
Omar Rodríguez-López albums